Roquemaure is a municipality in northwestern Quebec, Canada in the MRC d'Abitibi-Ouest. It covers 120.02 km2 and had a population of 409 as of the Canada 2021 Census.

The municipality was incorporated on January 1, 1952.

Demographics
Population trend:
 Population in 2021: 409 (2016 to 2021 population change: 3.5%)
 Population in 2016: 395 
 Population in 2011: 414 
 Population in 2006: 402
 Population in 2001: 451
 Population in 1996: 459
 Population in 1991: 455

Private dwellings occupied by usual residents: 185 (total dwellings: 215)

Mother tongue:
 English as first language: 0%
 French as first language: 100%
 English and French as first language: 0%
 Other as first language: 0%

Municipal council
 Mayor: Rachel Alarie
 Councillors: Chantal Mainville, Josée Chrétien, Mathieu Guillemette, Sébastien Roy

References

Municipalities in Quebec
Incorporated places in Abitibi-Témiscamingue
Populated places established in 1933